Xie Xuegong (October 6, 1916 – March 3, 1993) also known as Xie Bin was a People's Republic of China politician.

Biography
He was born in Xi County, Shanxi Province. He joined the Chinese Communist Party in July 1936. He was acting Chinese Communist Party Committee Secretary of his home province (July 1951 – July 1952). In 1966, he succeeded People's Liberation Army senior general Ulanhu (who later became Vice President of the People's Republic of China) as Party Secretary of Inner Mongolia. He was Party Secretary of Tianjin (May 1971 – June 1978) as well as mayor. He was expelled from the Chinese Communist Party in 1987. He died at the age of 76.

1916 births
1993 deaths
People's Republic of China politicians from Shanxi
Chinese Communist Party politicians from Shanxi
Political office-holders in Shanxi
Political office-holders in Inner Mongolia
Mayors of Tianjin
Political office-holders in Tianjin
Expelled members of the Chinese Communist Party
Politicians from Linfen
Presidents of Beijing University of International Business and Economics